Shikharpur (Nepali: शिखरपुर) is a village development committee in Makwanpur District in the Narayani Zone of southern Nepal. At the time of the 1991 Nepal census it had a population of 3884 people living in 667 individual households.

On 25 August 2010, an Agni Air Flight 101 flight crashed and 14 people along with the crew died here.

References

Populated places in Makwanpur District